Ronald Edsel Findlay (April 12, 1935 – October 8, 2021) was an economist and trade theorist. He was Professor of Economics at Columbia University, New York. 

He was born in Rangoon, Burma during British colonial rule. He has a BA from Rangoon University, Burma (1954) and a PhD from MIT (1960). He worked at Rangoon University as an economist first as a tutor (1954–57), then as a lecturer (1960–66), and finally as a research professor of (1966–68).

He joined Columbia in 1969 first as a visiting professor and was appointed a professor in 1970. His research focus has been on international trade and economic development, and he takes what has been described as a political economy perspective. He became a U.S. citizen in 1976.

Selected publications 
Selected publications include:
 with Kevin H. O'Rourke, 2007, "Power and Plenty: Trade, War, and the World Economy in the Second Millennium", Princeton University Press
 with Ronald W. Jones, 2001, "Input Trade and the Location of Production", The American Economic Review
 1996 "Modeling Global Interdependence: Centers, Peripheries, and Frontiers", The American Economic Review
 with Richard Clarida, 1992, "Government, Trade, and Comparative Advantage", The American Economic Review (1992);
 1992 "The Roots of Divergence: Western Economic History in Comparative Perspective", The American Economic Review
 with Stanislaw Wellisz, 1988, "The State and the Invisible Hand", World Bank Research Observer
 1984 "Trade and Development: Theory and Asian Experience", Asian Development Review, Vol 2, No. 2
 An "Austrian" Model of International Trade and Interest Rate Equalization, in Journal of Political Economy

See also 
 North–South model

References 

American development economists
University of Yangon alumni
1935 births
Living people
Massachusetts Institute of Technology alumni
Academic staff of the University of Yangon

American economists
Burmese emigrants to the United States
Columbia University faculty
Burmese economists